A sobriquet, or soubriquet, is a nickname, sometimes assumed, but often given by another, that is descriptive. A sobriquet is distinct from a pseudonym, as it is typically a familiar name used in place of a real name, without the need of explanation, and it often becomes more familiar than the original name.

The term sobriquet may apply to the nickname for a specific person, group of people, or place. Examples are "Emiye Menelik", a name of Emperor Menelik II of Ethiopia, who was popularly and affectionately recognized for his kindness ("emiye" means "mother" in Amharic); "Genghis Khan", who now is rarely recognized by his original name Temüjin ("Genghis Khan" means "universal ruler" in Mongolian); and Mohandas Gandhi, who is better known as "Mahatma" Gandhi ("mahatma" means "great soul" in Sanskrit). Well-known places often have sobriquets, such as New York City, often referred to as the "Big Apple".

Etymology 

The first early spelling variant, "soubriquet", remains in use and is considered the likely origin. 

Émile Littré gives an early-14th-century soubsbriquet as meaning a chuck under the chin, and this would be derived from soubs, mod. sous, under, and briquet or bruchel, the brisket, or lower part of the throat.

Use 

Sobriquets often are found in music, sports, comedy and politics. Candidates and political figures often are branded with sobriquets, either while living or posthumously. For example, president of the United States Abraham Lincoln came to be known as "Honest Abe".

In the A Dictionary of Modern English Usage (1926), Henry Watson Fowler warned: "Now the sobriquet habit is not a thing to be acquired, but a thing to be avoided; & the selection that follows is compiled for the purpose not of assisting but of discouraging it." He included the sobriquet among what he termed the "battered ornaments" of the language, but opinion on their use varies. Sobriquets remain a common feature of speech today.

Examples
 The King (of rock and roll) Elvis Presley, famous vocalist and musician
 The Lion City Singapore, the city-state, also known as Little Red Dot, The Garden City
 The Big Yin – Billy Connolly, Glaswegian comedian commonly referred to as "The Big Yin", meaning "The Big One" in Scots
 The Big Apple – New York City
 The Big Smoke - London 
 Godzone – New Zealand, from "God's own country"
 Albion – Britain
 Columbia – The United States or the Americas, poetic name
 Dixie, Dixieland (from the Mason–Dixon line) – the eleven Southern states that seceded and fought against the U.S. in the American Civil War
 The Fourth Estate – the press
 Land of the Rising Sun - Japan
Pearl of the Orient – the Philippines, referring to its location in the Southeast Asia (or the East, with "Orient" meaning "East")
 Graveyard of Empires – Afghanistan
 Londonistan – London, refers to the growing Muslim population of the city
 Uncle Sam – the U.S. in general or specifically, its government (likely from the initials "U.S.")
 Uncle Joe - Joseph Stalin
 The Sun King - Louis XIV of France
 Papa Doc - François Duvalier, 34th president of Haiti
 The Sage of Chelsea – Thomas Carlyle, Scots philosopher
 The War to End All Wars – World War I; since World War II, used ironically
 The Windy City – Chicago, Illinois
The Motor City - Detroit, Michigan
 Yankee (or "Yank" for short) – first recorded use attributed to British General James Wolfe, who used the word "Yankee" in 1758 to refer to the New England soldiers under his command. "I can afford you two companies of Yankees, and the more, because they are better for ranging and scouting than either work or vigilance". Later British use of the word was in a derogatory manner, as seen in a cartoon published in 1775 ridiculing "Yankee" (American) soldiers. In the Southern United States, the term is used in derisive reference to any Northerner, especially one who has migrated to the South and maintains derisive attitudes towards Southerners and the Southern way of life. Used outside the U.S. to mean any American; sometimes derogatory in usage
 Man's best friend - dogs, derived from the origins of dogs, it indicates the relationship that has developed between the two species as they have each evolved to form a symbiotic relationship that is unique among human relationships to domestic animals.

References

Citations

Sources

External links 
 

 
Semantics
Word play